Nabis is a genus of damsel bugs in the family Nabidae.

Species
Nabis contains the following species:

 Nabis argentinus Meyer-Dür, 1870
 Nabis blackburni White, 1978
 Nabis chinai Kerzhner, 1970
 Nabis chinensis Ren & Hsiao, 1981
 Nabis curtipennis Blackburn, 1888
 Nabis ealapaeoensis Kerzhner, 1968
 Nabis faminei Stål, 1859
 Nabis gagneorum Polhemus, 1999
 Nabis galapagoensis Kerzhner, 1968
 Nabis giffardi Van Duzee, 1936
 Nabis gracillima Heer, 1865
 Nabis heissi Kerzhner, 2006
 Nabis himalayensis Ren, 1988
 Nabis hsiaoi Kerzhner, 1992
 Nabis kaohinani (Kirkaldy, 1909)
 Nabis kavahalu (Kirkaldy, 1907)
 Nabis kerasphoros (Kirkaldy, 1907)
 Nabis koelensis Blackburn, 1888
 Nabis livida Heer, 1853
 Nabis lolupe (Kirkaldy, 1908)
 Nabis lucida Germar & Berendt, 1856
 Nabis lusciosus White, 1877
 Nabis maculata Heer, 1853
 Nabis morai (Kirkaldy, 1902)
 Nabis nepalensis Kerzhner, 1992
 Nabis nesiotes (Kirkaldy, 1909)
 Nabis nigriventris Stal, 1862
 Nabis nubicola (Kirkaldy, 1909)
 Nabis nubigenus (Kirkaldy, 1908)
 Nabis nukuhiva Polhemus, 2002
 Nabis oscillans Blackburn, 1888
 Nabis paludicola (Kirkaldy, 1908)
 Nabis paranensis Harris, 1931
 Nabis pele (Kirkaldy, 1909)
 Nabis procellaris (Kirkaldy, 1908)
 Nabis punctipennis Blanchard, 1852
 Nabis reductus Kerzhner, 1968
 Nabis renae Kerzhner, 2006
 Nabis roripes Stål, 1860
 Nabis rubritinctus Blackburn, 1888
 Nabis seticrus Harris, 1930
 Nabis sharpianus (Kirkaldy, 1902)
 Nabis silvicola (Kirkaldy, 1908)
 Nabis sordidus Reuter, 1872
 Nabis spinicrus (Reuter, 1890)
 Nabis subrufus White, 1877
 Nabis sylvestris (Kirkaldy, 1908)
 Nabis tandilensis (Berg, 1884)
 Nabis tarai (Kirkaldy, 1902)
 Nabis truculentus (Kirkaldy, 1908)
 Nabis vagabunda Heer, 1853

Subgenus Aspilaspis Stal, 1873 
 Nabis indicus (Stal, 1873)
 Nabis pallidus Fieber, 1861
 Nabis viridulus Spinola, 1837

Subgenus Australonabis Strommer, 1988 
 Nabis biformis (Bergroth, 1927)
 Nabis fraternus Kerzhner, 1970
 Nabis larvatus Kerzhner, 1970

Subgenus Dolichonabis Reuter, 1908 
 Nabis americolimbatus (Carayon, 1961)
 Nabis limbatus Dahlbom, 1851
 Nabis majusculus (Kerzhner, 1968)
 Nabis nigrovittatus J. Sahlberg, 1878
 Nabis tesquorum (Kerzhner, 1968)
 Nabis valentinae Kerzhner, 2006

Subgenus Halonabis Reuter, 1890 
 Nabis occidentalis (Kerzhner, 1963)
 Nabis sareptanus Dohrn, 1862
 Nabis sinicus (Hsiao, 1964)

Subgenus Limnonabis Kerzhner, 1968 
 Nabis demissus (Kerzhner, 1968)
 Nabis lineatus Dahlbom, 1851
 Nabis ponticus (Kerzhner, 1962)
 Nabis propinqua (Reuter, 1872)
 Nabis sauteri (Poppius, 1915)
 Nabis ussuriensis (Kerzhner., 1962)

Subgenus Milu Kirkaldy, 1907 
 Nabis apicalis Matsumura, 1913
 Nabis medogensis Ren, 1988
 Nabis potanini Bianchi, 1896
 Nabis reuteri Jakovlev, 1876
 Nabis semiferus Hsiao, 1964
 Nabis yulongensis Ren & G.Q. Liu, 1989

Subgenus Nabicula Kirby, 1837 
 Nabis flavomarginatus Scholtz, 1847
 Nabis subcoleoptratus Kirby, 1837
 Nabis vanduzeei (Kirkaldy, 1901)

Subgenus Nabis Latreille, 1802 
 Nabis brevis Scholz, 1847
 Nabis cinerascens Horváth, 1904
 Nabis consobrinus Bianchi, 1896
 Nabis edax Blatchely, 1929
 Nabis ericetorum Scholtz, 1847
 Nabis ferus (Linnaeus, 1758)
 Nabis hispanicus Remane, 1964
 Nabis intermedius Kerzhner, 1963
 Nabis mediterraneus Remane, 1962
 Nabis meridionalis Kerzhner, 1963
 Nabis mexicanus Remane, 1964
 Nabis palifer Seidenstücker, 1954
 Nabis persimilis Reuter, 1890
 Nabis provencalis Remane, 1953
 Nabis pseudoferus Remane, 1949
 Nabis punctatus A. Costa, 1847
 Nabis remanei Kerzhner, 1962
 Nabis reuterianus Puton, 1880
 Nabis riegeri Kerzhner, 1996
 Nabis roseipennis Reuter, 1872
 Nabis rufusculus Reuter, 1872
 Nabis rugosus (Linnaeus, 1758)
 Nabis sinoferus Hsiao, 1964
 Nabis stenoferus Hsiao, 1964
 Nabis wudingensis Ren, 1998

Subgenus Philobatus Kerzhner, 1968 
 Nabis christophi Dohrn, 1862

Subgenus Reduviolus Kirby, 1837 
 Nabis alternatus Parshley, 1922
 Nabis americanus Remane, 1964
 Nabis americoferus Carayon, 1961
 Nabis inscriptus (Kirby, 1837)
 Nabis kalmii Reuter, 1872

Subgenus Tropiconabis Kerzhner, 1968 
 Nabis capsiformis Germar, 1838
 Nabis consimilis (Reuter, 1912)
 Nabis kinbergii Reuter, 1872
 Nabis latior Kerzhner & Henry, 2008
 Nabis maoricus Walker, 1873

References

Nabidae
Heteroptera genera